Federico Browne (born 7 April 1976) is a former professional tennis player from Argentina.

Career
Browne was the number one ranked junior in the world in 1994, winning numerous titles that year, including the Banana Bowl. He was also the 1994 Banana Bowl doubles runner-up, with Carlos Jose Tori. In the 1994 US Open he reached the semi-finals, where he was beaten by Sjeng Schalken and he was a semi-finalist in the Orange Bowl as well, for the second successive year.

In 1995, Browne appeared in a Davis Cup tie for Argentina. He played the second singles rubber, against Venezuelan Nicolás Pereira, who beat him in straight sets.

His best performance on the ATP Tour came at Buenos Aires in 2004, when he and Diego Veronelli were runners-up in the men's doubles. He also made doubles semi-finals in Sopot partnering Enzo Artoni and the Shanghai Open with Ivo Karlović, both in 2003. On the singles circuit he reached two quarter-finals, at the 2000 BMW Open as a lucky loser and at Casablanca in 2003.

On each of the two occasions he competed in the main singles draw of the French Open, Browne made the second round. In 2000 he defeated Juan Antonio Marín in the opening round, before losing in his next match by Sébastien Grosjean, in a five setter. Three years later he came from two sets down to defeat world number 59 Olivier Rochus in the first round. He was beaten in the second round by Félix Mantilla. His best doubles showing at Grand Slam level was a second round appearance in the 2004 French Open, which he and partner Karlovic earned after defeating Tomáš Berdych and Dominik Hrbatý.

He is now a tennis coach.

ATP career finals

Doubles: 1 (0–1)

Challenger titles

Singles: (3)

Doubles: (10)

References

1976 births
Living people
Argentine male tennis players
Argentine people of English descent
Tennis players from Buenos Aires